Dentsply Sirona is an American dental equipment manufacturer and dental consumables producer that markets its products in over 120 countries. It has factories in 21 countries. The present company is largely the result of a merger in 1993 in which Gendex Corporation acquired Dentsply International Inc. for $590 million.

As an equipment maker, it designs and manufactures laboratory and specialty products relating to dental supplies.  With regards to consumable products, it specializes in anesthetics, plaque and gum disease prevention (prophylaxis) and tooth polishers. It also designs and constructs artificial teeth.  It has also been cited as a key player in the future-intra oral flat panel sensor market.  Because of the income disparity between wealthy and developing nations, the variety of products in demand differs from region to region (and thus subsidiary to subsidiary since many of them are regional).

On August 28, 2022, Dentsply Sirona announced the appointment of Simon D. Campion, formerly Executive Vice President and President of the Interventional segment for BD , as President and Chief Executive Officer and a member of the board.
In 2018 a Netherlands-based certification company awarded Dentsply the “Top Employer” certification.

In 2019 the company joined forces with the American Association for Dental Research (AADR) to co-sponsor the Student Competition for Advancing Dental Research and its Application (SCADA).  The SCADA aims to bolster students research.

The company was ranked #56 by Forbes as America's Best Midsize Employers 2019.

History

1899–2000
Dentsply was founded by four New York businessmen in 1899 as Dentists' Supply Company, about the same time it made its first acquisition, a Pennsylvania porcelain teeth manufacturer.  One of the four founders, George H. Whiteley became the main operator of the company as a result of his experience as a ceramicist.  Whiteley's contributions to the company were invaluable as he was responsible for many innovations such as a patented process involving platinum rings that reduced tooth breakage.  Other innovations (credited to doctors like James Williams who were hired by the company for research purposes) included better fitting dentures, tooth size for people of different face shapes and age specific colored teeth.

In the early 1920s, the company selected European distributor E. de Trey & Sons as its primary marketer to Europe, however it quickly became the company's main distributor in the US also.  A rivalry between De Trey and the main other denture equipment producer at the time, Ash Company, nearly eliminated cash flows due to extreme price cutting. The problem was resolved when the two decided to merge their distribution businesses into one named the Amalgamated Dental Company Limited.  In 1925, 45% of Zahnfabrik (artificial teeth producer) was bought by Dentists' Supply and its distributor Amalgamated Dental bought a 30% interest in the manufacturer.

High American tariffs and increased efforts to gain market share abroad, especially in Europe and Australia, led the company to set up more research and manufacturing centers abroad.  Its first foreign subsidiary was established in Australia as a means to acquire Natudryl Manufacturing.  In the 1950s and 1960s the company developed many of the ideas used by its equipment today like tooth cleaning machine Dentsply Cavitron and Neolux which improved the finish of plastic teeth. The company renamed itself Dentsply International in 1969 due to its products' brand name being more widely recognized.

Key acquisitions by Dentists' Supply Company: LD Caulk Company in 1963, Ransom and Randolph Company in 1964, F&F Koenigkramer Company (chairs and stools). Largest was Amalgamated Dental Industrial (former distributor that played a major role in helping the company grow early on that also controlled Australia's largest dental supply chain) in 1976.

In 1993, after it acquired Gendex Corporation in a reverse takeover, the company went public on the NASDAQ.  The new company then purchased medical X-ray tubes supplier Eureka X-Ray Inc., which was key since Gendex was a major manufacturer of X-ray systems (Eureka X-Ray was later sold in 1994). Healthco, its main distributor in the US, went bankrupt in 1993.

2000–present
In 2010, the most important markets for sales were Europe & CIS (40%), USA (37%), Latin America (5%), Asia (excl CIS and Japan, 5%), Canada (4%), Japan (4%), Middle East & Africa (3%) and Australia (2%). Dentsply holds a leading market share in the dental restorative sector ($4.0 billion according to the company).

In June 2011, Dentsply acquired Astra Tech, the world's third largest maker of dental implants from the Anglo-Swedish pharmaceutical company AstraZeneca for $1.8 billion. The deal raises revenue by 25% ($535M) and was completed on August 31, 2011. Acquisitions in 2011 caused the value of long term debt to increase by 147% while total assets grew by 146% (current assets however decreased in value).  Acquisition/restructuring charges were one of the reasons net income decreased 7.4%.

Markets outside the United States are becoming increasingly important: they accounted for 67% of Dentsply revenue in 2013 steady with 2012 but up from 66% and 63% the previous two years.

In 2012, acquisitions contributed all of the growth in sales (16.2%, currency effects were -3.8%).  2012 sales growth by region: Europe 27.5% (vs 17.9% in 2011), USA 13.8% (vs 4.9%), elsewhere 15.9% (vs 9.4%).  88% of net sales were in dental products, 12% from consumable medical device products (casting industry).

On February 29, 2016 Dentsply combined with Long Island-based Sirona Dental Systems in a $14.5 billion merger of equals.  While both supply dental products, Sirona's business centers on dental equipment in contrast with Dentsply's consumables.

In October 2017, CEO Jeffrey Slovin, executive chairman Bret Wise, and president Christopher Clark all resigned. On January 17, 2018, Dentsply Sirona announced the appointment of Donald Casey Jr., formerly CEO of the Medical Segment of Cardinal Health, as CEO and a member of the board, with Casey to take the role in February and succeed interim CEO Mark Thierer.

In May 2022, it has been reported by current employees, that current CEO Donald Casey, has been fired from his position.  Interim CEO was announced to be John Groetelaars. In September 2022, Simon Campion was announced as the full-time CEO replacing Don Casey. Both former CEO Donald Casey and former CFO Jorge Gomez are under investigation by Dentsply Sirona Inc. and the SEC for securities fraud.

See also 

 United States v. Dentsply Int'l, Inc.

References

External links 

Companies based in Charlotte, North Carolina
Dental companies of the United States
American companies established in 1899
1899 establishments in New York (state)
Health care companies based in North Carolina
Medical technology companies of the United States
Companies listed on the Nasdaq
American brands